This article details the fixtures and results of the Thailand national football team in 2011.
 Only record the results that affect the FIFA/Coca-Cola World Ranking. See FIFA 'A' matches criteria.

Record

Goalscorers

vs Myanmar (1)
International friendly

Assistant referees:
 Thanom Borikut   (Thailand)
 Surasak Kuldiloksirodom (Thailand)
Fourth official:
 Pathan Nasawang (Thailand)

vs Myanmar (2)
International friendly

vs Palestine (1)
2014 FIFA World Cup qualification – AFC second round

Assistant referees:
 Jeong Hae-Sang  (South Korea)
 Kang Do-joon (South Korea)
Fourth official:
 Kim Jong-Hyeok (South Korea)

vs Palestine (2)
2014 FIFA World Cup qualification – AFC second round

Assistant referees:
 Ebrahim Saleh (Bahrain)
 Aziz Al Wadi (Bahrain)
Fourth official:
 Abdulameer Abdulshaheed (Bahrain)

vs Singapore
International friendly

Assistant referees:
 Thanom Borikut (Thailand)
 Atthakorn Wetchakan (Thailand)
Fourth official:
 Apisit Aonrak(Thailand)

vs Australia (1)
2014 FIFA World Cup qualification – AFC third round

Assistant referees:
 Waleed Al Mannai  (Qatar)
 Ramzan Al-Naemi (Qatar)
Fourth official:
 Banjar Al-Dosari (Qatar)

vs Oman
2014 FIFA World Cup qualification – AFC third round

Assistant referees:
 Jeong Hae-Sang  (South Korea)
 Lee Jung-Min (South Korea)
Fourth official:
 Lee Dong-jun (South Korea)

vs Jordan
International friendly

vs Saudi Arabia (1)
2014 FIFA World Cup qualification – AFC third round

Assistant referees:
 Abdukhamidullo Rasulov  (Uzbekistan)
 Bakhadyr Kochkarov (Kyrgyzstan)
Fourth official:
 Viktor Serazitdinov (Uzbekistan)

vs Saudi Arabia (2)
2014 FIFA World Cup qualification – AFC third round

Assistant referees:
 Shui Hung Chan  (Hong Kong)
 Chung Ming Sang (Hong Kong)
Fourth official:
 Ng Kai Lam (Hong Kong)

vs Australia (2)
2014 FIFA World Cup qualification – AFC third round

Assistant referees:
 Mohammadreza Abolfazli  (Iran)
 Saeid Alinezhadian (Iran)
Fourth official:
 Hedayat Mombini (Iran)

Links
Fixtures and Results on FIFA.com
Thailand Matches on Elo Ratings

2011 in Thai football
2011 national football team results
Thailand national football team results